A land mobile radio system (LMRS) is a person-to-person voice communication system consisting of two-way radio transceivers (an audio transmitter and receiver in one unit)  which can be stationary (base station units), mobile (installed in vehicles), or portable (handheld walkie-talkies).  Public land mobile radio systems are made for use exclusively by public safety organizations such as police, fire, and ambulance services, and other governmental organizations, and use special frequencies reserved for these services.  Private land mobile radio systems are designed for private commercial use, by firms such as taxis or delivery services. Most systems are half-duplex, with multiple radios sharing a single radio channel, so only one radio can transmit at a time. The transceiver is normally in receiving mode so the user can hear other radios on the channel; to talk, the user presses a push to talk button that turns on the transmitter mode of the transceiver. Land mobile radio systems use channels in the VHF or UHF bands, since the antennas used at these short wavelengths are small enough to mount on vehicles or handheld transceivers. Transmitter power is usually limited to a few watts, to provide a reliable working range on the order of  depending on terrain. Repeaters installed on tall buildings, hills or mountain peaks can be used to increase the coverage area. Older systems use AM or FM modulation, while some recent systems use digital modulation allowing them to transmit data as well as sound.

Military use
Land mobile radio systems are widely used by the military. Separate bands in the radio spectrum are reserved for military use.

Commercial use
Many businesses and industries throughout the world use LMR as their primary means of communication, especially from a fixed location to mobile users (i.e. from a base site to a fleet of mobiles). Commercial LMR Radios are typically available in the VHF and UHF frequency bands. 30−50 MHz (sometimes called "Low VHF Band" or "Low Band"), 150−172 MHz (sometimes called "High VHF Band" or "High Band"), 450−470 MHz "UHF". Many larger populated areas have additional UHF frequencies from 470 to 490 MHz, and 490−512 MHz. VHF bands works well in outdoor environments, over bodies of water, and many other applications. UHF bands typically perform better in urban environments and with penetrating obstacles such as buildings. There are also frequencies in the 800 and 900 MHz range available. Commercial, public safety and government users are required to obtain U.S. Federal Communications Commission licensing in the United States and must follow Government law.

Interference in the spectrum
In November 2005, many automatic garage doors in Ottawa, Ontario, Canada, had suddenly stopped working, due to a powerful radio signal that appeared to be interfering with the remote controls that open them.

In the summer of 2004, garage door operators noticed similar phenomena around U.S. military bases. The strong radio signals on the 390-megahertz band overpowered the garage door openers. One technician likened it to a whisper competing with a yell.

Repeaters
Mobile and portable stations have a fairly limited range, usually three to twenty miles (~5 to 32 km) depending on terrain. Repeaters can be used to increase the range of these stations. They are usually placed upon hills and buildings to increase range.

Repeaters have one or more receivers and a transmitter, with a controller. The controller activates the repeater when it detects a carrier on one of its incoming channels, representing a user talking. The repeater receives the radio signal, demodulates it to an audio signal which is filtered to remove noise, and retransmits it on a second channel to avoid interference with the first signal. This is received by a second two way radio in the repeater's expanded listening area. When the second user replies on the second channel, representing the other half of the half-duplex conversation, his signal is received by the repeater and similarly translated and retransmitted on the first channel back to the first user. Most controllers also decode Continuous Tone-Coded Squelch System tones, which allows the repeater to activate only if the station is sending a particular pre-programmed code, preventing unauthorized stations from using the repeater. Additionally, as repeaters are placed on high locations it also prevents distant stations on the same frequency from interfering. A Morse code or a synthesized voice module may produce station ID to comply with station identification regulations; this is most common on amateur radio repeaters, some LMR stations must also identify to be legal in some areas.

Along with the repeater units, most stations utilize duplexers. These are notch filters usually in an array of six, eight, and sometimes four units. They separate the transmitter and receiver signals from each other so one antenna and coaxial line can be utilized. While this solution is very efficient and easy to install, factors such as humidity and temperature can affect the performance of duplexers, so in most configurations a dryer is installed to keep humidity out of the duplexers and coaxial cable, along with heated buildings in which they are installed in. Excellent quality coaxial cable, connectors, and antennas must also be used, as a single-antenna is not as forgiving as a dual antenna system since any RF leakage or poor connection can greatly decay the reliability and performance of the repeater. In some applications, cables going from the repeater and duplexers must be tuned to mitigate these issues.

In dual antenna systems, there are two antennas and two lengths of coaxial cable running from the transmitter and receiver. Usually, triple shield coax and or low loss Heliax are used to keep the two systems isolated. Two antenna systems are usually used if tower space is not limited, or space to build an array is available. The only issues with dual antenna systems is isolating the antennas so the receiver is not receiving what the transmitter is putting out. If this happens, it creates a loop, much like the feedback heard when a microphone is placed near a speaker. When this happens the repeater amplifies its own signal until it is either powered off or a TOT (time out timer) is expired.

To solve this antennas must be placed several wavelengths from each other in opposite vertical planes. For example, the receiver antenna is vertically polarized, while the transmitter antenna is placed one wavelength (or more) below the receiver antenna, but rotated 180° as to maintain vertical polarization. Antennas that have a null spot directly above and below them are excellent choices since another antenna can be placed in the null zone and isn't affected as much. Antennas must also be polarized the same as the stations trying to access the repeater—usually vertical polarization.

See also
 Land mobile service
 Astro (Motorola)

References

Military radio systems